Edgewater Park is a township in Burlington County, in the U.S. state of New Jersey and a northeastern Delaware Valley suburb of Philadelphia. As of the 2020 United States census, the township's population was 8,930, an increase of 49 (+0.6%) from the 2010 census count of 8,881, which in turn reflected an increase of 1,017 (+12.9%) from the 7,864 counted in the 2000 census.

Edgewater Park was incorporated as a township by an act of the New Jersey Legislature on February 26, 1924, from portions of Beverly Township (now known as Delanco Township). The township was named for its location along the Delaware River.

Geography 
According to the United States Census Bureau, the township had a total area of 3.08 square miles (7.97 km2), including 2.92 square miles (7.56 km2) of land and 0.16 square miles (0.41 km2) of water (5.06%).

The township borders the municipalities of Beverly, Burlington Township, Delanco Township and Willingboro Township in Burlington County; and both Bensalem Township and Bristol Township in Pennsylvania, across the Delaware River.

Unincorporated communities, localities and place names located partially or completely within the township include Capitol Hill, Perkins and Wallrope Works.

Demographics

2010 census

The Census Bureau's 2006–2010 American Community Survey showed that (in 2010 inflation-adjusted dollars) median household income was $53,502 (with a margin of error of +/− $3,682) and the median family income was $68,572 (+/− $15,261). Males had a median income of $45,865 (+/− $6,080) versus $40,400 (+/− $9,192) for females. The per capita income for the township was $26,916 (+/− $2,025). About 9.7% of families and 11.7% of the population were below the poverty line, including 21.2% of those under age 18 and none of those age 65 or over.

2000 census
As of the 2000 United States census there were 7,864 people, 3,152 households, and 2,099 families residing in the township. The racial makeup of the township was 68.07% White, 21.40% African American, 0.17% Native American, 3.26% Asian, 0.01% Pacific Islander, 3.20% from other races, and 3.89% from two or more races. Hispanic or Latino of any race were 6.60% of the population.

As of the 2000 Census, 1.9% of residents identified themselves as being of Turkish American ancestry, the second-highest of any municipality in the United States and highest in the state.

There were 3,152 households, out of which 29.2% had children under the age of 18 living with them, 46.9% were married couples living together, 13.7% had a female householder with no husband present, and 33.4% were non-families. 27.5% of all households were made up of individuals, and 9.6% had someone living alone who was 65 years of age or older. The average household size was 2.49 and the average family size was 3.03.

In the township the population was spread out, with 23.0% under the age of 18, 8.1% from 18 to 24, 30.7% from 25 to 44, 25.2% from 45 to 64, and 13.0% who were 65 years of age or older.  The median age was 38 years. For every 100 females, there were 93.0 males. For every 100 females age 18 and over, there were 91.8 males.

The median income for a household in the township was $48,936, and the median income for a family was $52,016. Males had a median income of $38,156 versus $27,304 for females. The per capita income for the township was $22,920. About 7.3% of families and 8.6% of the population were below the poverty line, including 13.9% of those under age 18 and 3.5% of those age 65 or over.

Government

Local government 
Edgewater Park is governed under the Township form of New Jersey municipal government, one of 141 municipalities (of the 564) statewide that use this form, the second-most commonly used form of government in the state. The Township Committee is comprised of five members, who are elected directly by the voters at-large in partisan elections to serve three-year terms of office on a staggered basis, with either one or two seats coming up for election each year as part of the November general election in a three-year cycle. At an annual reorganization meeting, the Township Committee selects one of its members to serve as Mayor and another as Deputy Mayor.

, members of the Edgewater Park Township Committee are Mayor William A. "Bill" Belgard (D, 2022) (D, term on committee and as mayor ends December 31, 2022), Deputy Mayor Kevin P. Johnson (D, term on committee ends 2024; term as deputy mayor ends 2022), Lauren Kremper DiFilippo (D, 2023), Juanita A. Scott (D, 2023) and Michael J. Trainor (D, 2024).

In September 2017, Kevin Johnson was selected from three candidates nominated by the Democratic municipal committee and appointed to fill the seat expiring in December 2018 that became vacant following the death of John G. McElwee the previous month. Johnson served on an interim basis until the November 2017 general election, when he was elected to serve the balance of the term of office.

In January 2017, the Township Committee selected Azunnah C. Amutah from three candidates nominated by the Democratic municipal committee to assume the term expiring in December 2017 that had been held by Barbara Perkins, who resigned from office in December 2016.

Brett V. Evans is the Police Chief of the Edgewater Park Township Police Department.

Federal, state and county representation 
Edgewater Park is located in the 3rd Congressional District and is part of New Jersey's 7th state legislative district.

 

Burlington County is governed by a Board of County Commissioners comprised of five members who are chosen at-large in partisan elections to serve three-year terms of office on a staggered basis, with either one or two seats coming up for election each year; at an annual reorganization meeting, the board selects a director and deputy director from among its members to serve a one-year term. , Burlington County's Commissioners are
Director Felicia Hopson (D, Willingboro Township, term as commissioner ends December 31, 2024; term as director ends 2023),
Deputy Director Tom Pullion (D, Edgewater Park, term as commissioner and as deputy director ends 2023),
Allison Eckel (D, Medford, 2025),
Daniel J. O'Connell (D, Delran Township, 2024) and 
Balvir Singh (D, Burlington Township, 2023). 
Burlington County's Constitutional Officers are
County Clerk Joanne Schwartz (R, Southampton Township, 2023)
Sheriff James H. Kostoplis (D, Bordentown, 2025) and 
Surrogate Brian J. Carlin (D, Burlington Township, 2026).

Politics
As of March 2011, there were a total of 4,798 registered voters in Edgewater Park Township, of which 2,119 (44.2% vs. 33.3% countywide) were registered as Democrats, 819 (17.1% vs. 23.9%) were registered as Republicans and 1,857 (38.7% vs. 42.8%) were registered as Unaffiliated. There were 3 voters registered as Libertarians or Greens. Among the township's 2010 Census population, 54.0% (vs. 61.7% in Burlington County) were registered to vote, including 67.8% of those ages 18 and over (vs. 80.3% countywide).

In the 2012 presidential election, Democrat Barack Obama received 2,596 votes (69.3% vs. 58.1% countywide), ahead of Republican Mitt Romney with 1,083 votes (28.9% vs. 40.2%) and other candidates with 41 votes (1.1% vs. 1.0%), among the 3,744 ballots cast by the township's 5,007 registered voters, for a turnout of 74.8% (vs. 74.5% in Burlington County). In the 2008 presidential election, Democrat Barack Obama received 2,719 votes (67.8% vs. 58.4% countywide), ahead of Republican John McCain with 1,223 votes (30.5% vs. 39.9%) and other candidates with 36 votes (0.9% vs. 1.0%), among the 4,012 ballots cast by the township's 4,942 registered voters, for a turnout of 81.2% (vs. 80.0% in Burlington County). In the 2004 presidential election, Democrat John Kerry received 2,218 votes (60.9% vs. 52.9% countywide), ahead of Republican George W. Bush with 1,385 votes (38.0% vs. 46.0%) and other candidates with 20 votes (0.5% vs. 0.8%), among the 3,643 ballots cast by the township's 4,680 registered voters, for a turnout of 77.8% (vs. 78.8% in the whole county).

In the 2013 gubernatorial election, Republican Chris Christie received 1,189 votes (53.0% vs. 61.4% countywide), ahead of Democrat Barbara Buono with 996 votes (44.4% vs. 35.8%) and other candidates with 17 votes (0.8% vs. 1.2%), among the 2,244 ballots cast by the township's 5,087 registered voters, yielding a 44.1% turnout (vs. 44.5% in the county). In the 2009 gubernatorial election, Democrat Jon Corzine received 1,363 ballots cast (56.7% vs. 44.5% countywide), ahead of Republican Chris Christie with 871 votes (36.2% vs. 47.7%), Independent Chris Daggett with 115 votes (4.8% vs. 4.8%) and other candidates with 22 votes (0.9% vs. 1.2%), among the 2,403 ballots cast by the township's 4,940 registered voters, yielding a 48.6% turnout (vs. 44.9% in the county).

Education 
The Edgewater Park School District serves public school students in grades from pre-kindergarten through eighth grade. As of the 2018–19 school year, the district, comprised of two schools, had an enrollment of 910 students and 76.1 classroom teachers (on an FTE basis), for a student–teacher ratio of 12.0:1. Schools in the district (with 2018–19 enrollment data from the National Center for Education Statistics) are 
Mildred Magowan Elementary School with 528 students in grades Pre-K–4 and 
Samuel M. Ridgway Middle School with 373 students in grades 5–8.

For ninth through twelfth grades, public school students attend Burlington City High School in Burlington, as part of a sending/receiving relationship with the City of Burlington Public School District, in which Edgewater Park students account for almost 40% of the high school's enrollment. As of the 2018–19 school year, the high school had an enrollment of 643 students and 73.6 classroom teachers (on an FTE basis), for a student–teacher ratio of 8.7:1.

Students from Edgewater Park, and from all of Burlington County, are eligible to attend the Burlington County Institute of Technology, a countywide public school district that serves the vocational and technical education needs of students at the high school and post-secondary level at its campuses in Medford and Westampton.

Transportation

Roads and highways

U.S. Route 130 is the main highway serving Edgewater Park, running along the southeastern edge of the township, forming its border with neighboring Willingboro Township. County Route 543 also passes through the township close to the Delaware River. Both roads are oriented southwest to northeast parallel to the river, but are signed north–south.

Public transportation
NJ Transit provides bus service on the 409 route between Trenton and Philadelphia, and on the 419 route between Camden and Burlington.

BurLink bus service is offered on the B2 route between Beverly and Westampton Township.

Notable people

People who were born in, residents of, or otherwise closely associated with Edgewater Park include:

 Diane Allen (born 1948), former television anchor who served in the New Jersey Senate from 1998 to 2018
 Aimee Belgard (born 1974), member of the Burlington County Board of Chosen Freeholders since her election in 2012 who served on the Edgewater Park Township Committee from 2012 until she took office as freeholder in 2013
 Samuel C. Forker (1821–1900), Congressman who represented  from 1871 to 1873
 Anthony Giacchino (born 1970), filmmaker and composer
 Michael Giacchino (born 1967), soundtrack composer
 Edward Burd Grubb Jr. (1841–1913), Civil War General and United States Ambassador to Spain
 Carla Katz (born 1959), attorney who served as president of Local 1034 of the Communications Workers of America from 1999 until 2008, and received public notice for her relationship with Jon Corzine, both before and during his term as Governor of New Jersey
 Grover C. Richman Jr. (1911–1983), lawyer who served as U.S. Attorney for the District of New Jersey from 1951 to 1953 and as New Jersey Attorney General from 1954 to 1958
 Barney Schultz (1926–2015), pitcher in Major League Baseball from 1955 to 1965
 Charles B. Yates (1939–2000), politician who served in the New Jersey General Assembly from the 7th Legislative District from 1972 to 1978 and in the New Jersey Senate from 1978 to 1982

References

External links 

Township of Edgewater Park

 
1924 establishments in New Jersey
Populated places established in 1924
Township form of New Jersey government
Townships in Burlington County, New Jersey
New Jersey populated places on the Delaware River